Rajkumari Amrit Kaur College of Nursing is a public funded institute administratively governed by the Ministry of Health and Family Welfare, Government of India. It is a constituent college of University of Delhi. The college ranked second in India for Nursing Education (2016).

History
The history of Rajkumari Amrit Kaur College of Nursing can be traced back to the School of Nursing Administration founded in 1943. 
 As a temporary campus, the college was allotted the vacated American Army Barracks and its Ccensor's block at, Jaswant Singh Road, and FEB Hostel at Curzon Road New Delhi walkable distance from India Gate. College of Nursing, New Delhi since its inception is a constituent college of University of Delhi. In 1971, the President of India Shri. V.V. Giri laid the foundation stone for a new college campus consisting of Teaching & Administrative block, UG & PG hostels, Residential quarters/family accommodation for teachers, non-teaching staff and a playground. In July 1973 the college shifted to its permanent campus at Lajpat Nagar, New Delhi.

Etymology
The School of Nursing Administration amalgamated into the College of Nursing in 1946. In 1973, College of Nursing New Delhi was renamed as ‘Rajkumari Amrit Kaur College of Nursing’ after Rajkumari Amrit Kaur independent India's first Health Minister who was instrumental in the development of the college as well as the nursing profession in India.

Campus
The campus is located in South Delhi, Lajpat Nagar, adjacent to Moolchand metro station and Central School, Andrewsganj, New Delhi.

Academics
The college offers Undergraduate and graduate programs in nursing.
 BSc.(Hons.) Nursing
 MSc. Nursing
 M.Phil. in Nursing
 Ph.D. in Nursing

Apart from the regular academic programs, the college also serves as a study center for Indira Gandhi National Open University (IGNOU). The college is also designated as regional center for Ph.D. in Nursing program of Indian Nursing Council, a World Health Organization (WHO) supported initiative.

Departments
 Nursing Arts 
 Medical & Surgical Nursing 
 Pediatric Nursing 
 Obstetrics & Obstetrical Nursing 
 Psychiatric Nursing 
 Nursing Research 
 Community Health Nursing
 Continuing Education 
 Child Guidance Clinic 
 Rural Field Teaching Centre Chhawla

Students
Students from almost every state & UT of India are on the rolls, international students are mainly from SAARC countries, Sub-Saharan African countries and the Middle-East. International students have to apply through the Ministry of External Affairs, Government of India.

Successive principals
Margaretta Craig OBE (1946–1958)
Edith Buchanan (1958-1964)
Sulochana Krishnan
Anna Gupta (née Mathews)
Aparna Bhaduri 
Bandana Bhattacharya
Asha Sharma 
Kalpana Madal
Santosh Mehta  
Harinderjeet Goyal

Notable alumni
 Dr. Anice George
 Dr. Aparna Bhaduri

References 

1943 establishments in India
Nursing in India
Universities and colleges in Delhi